Coupling is a connection or joint between two things.

Coupling may also refer to:

Coupling (physics), when two systems are interacting with each other
Rotational–vibrational coupling, occurring when rotation frequency of an object is close to or identical to a natural internal vibration frequency
Angular momentum coupling, the combining of quantized angular momentum (e.g., the interaction between two nuclei in nuclear magnetic resonance)
Quantum coupling, when quantum states in one of the systems will cause an instantaneous change in all of the bound systems
Coupling (computer programming), the degree to which each program module relies on each one of the other modules
Coupling (electronics), the transfer of a signal from one medium or circuit block to another
Coupling (genetics), a type of genetic linkage
Coupling (piping), a short length of pipe or tube to connect two pipes or tubes together
Coupling (probability), a proof technique in probability theory
Railway coupling, a mechanism for connecting railway rolling stock
Azo coupling, often called "coupling", an electrophilic substitution reaction
Coupling reaction, reactions between hydrocarbon fragments in organic chemistry
Hose coupling, a piece on the end of a hose to connect it to extra hoses or hose appliances
Coupling track, a term in music recording for a B-side track
Joint encoding, an audio compression technique in which the redundancy of information between audio channels is reduced; also commonly known as channel coupling or stereo coupling
Mating or the act of sexual intercourse
Coupling, the distance formed by the lumbar vertebrae of a horse's back.

Television
Coupling (UK TV series), a British sitcom written by Steven Moffat for the BBC
Coupling (U.S. TV series), a short-lived American sitcom based on the British series
Coupling (Greek TV series), a short-lived Greek sitcom based on the British series

See also
 Decoupling (disambiguation)
 Coupling rod a device for connecting the driving wheels of a locomotive
 Couple (disambiguation)
 Coupler (disambiguation)
 Short-coupled (disambiguation)
 Uncouple (disambiguation)